Kishen Shailesh Velani (born 2 September 1994) is an English cricketer who most recently played for Essex in first-class matches as a right-handed batsman who bowls right arm medium pace. Velani has previously played for the Wanstead and Snaresbrook cricket clubs. In November 2013 he was dropped from the England under-19 squad due to a lack of fitness two months prior to the World Cup.

In October 2017, Velani left Essex at the end of his contract.

References

External links

1994 births
English cricketers
Essex cricketers
Living people
British sportspeople of Indian descent
British Asian cricketers
People from the London Borough of Newham
Cricketers from Greater London